The 1950 British Empire Trophy was a non-Championship Formula One motor race held on 15 June 1950 at the Douglas Circuit, in Douglas, Isle of Man. It was the ninth race of the 1950 Formula One season.

The 36-lap race was won by ERA driver Bob Gerard. Cuth Harrison finished second in an ERA, and Emmanuel de Graffenried third in a Maserati.

Results

References

Race results are taken from and

External links
Douglas Circuit (1947-1953) on Google Maps (Historic Formula 1 Tracks)

British Empire Trophy
British Empire Trophy
Brit
1950 in the Isle of Man